Vladimir Vladimirovich Belousov ( in Moscow – December 25, 1990) was an Earth scientist in the Soviet Union, and a prominent advocate of alternatives to the theories of plate tectonics and seafloor spreading during the period of the 20th century in which debate on these subjects was most intense.

Belousov was head of the Geodynamics Department of the Institute of the Physics of the Earth in Moscow (from 1944), a corresponding member of the Academy of Sciences of the Soviet Union (from 1953), and a professor at both the Moscow Geological Surveyance Institute (from 1943) and Moscow State University (from 1953). From 1960 to 1963, Belousov was President of the International Union of Geodesy and Geophysics (IUGG). He was also a Foreign Member of Geological Society of London.

In 1942 he advanced theory that the Earth's material has gradually differentiated according to its density to produce the present internal structure of the Earth and that this gradual movement is the basic cause of movements of the Earth's crust.

During the 1960s he led three expeditions to the East African Rift to study continental structure and the Earth's mantle. These trips fuelled his idea that continental crust was transformed to oceanic crust by widespread processes involving basic magmas.

Although his theories were ultimately rejected by the scientific community, he was an important figure in the development of the Earth sciences within the Soviet union following the Second World War.

Bibliography

Papers in English
 Belousov V.V. The upper mantle project: World scientists join in a great venture. - The Courier UNESCO. 1963. N 10. P. 12–17.
 Belousov V.V. The upper mantle and its influence on the development of the Earth's crust. - JCSU Review of world science. 1964. Vol. 6. P. 72–77.
 Belousov V.V. The relationship between the Earth's crust and the deeper layers of the Earth. - Joum. Indian Geoph. Union. 1965. Vol. 1, N 1. P. 1–7; Ibid. Vol. 2, N 2. P. 81–86.
 Belousov V.V. Modern concepts of the structure and development of the Earth's crust and the upper mantle of continents. - Quart. Journ. Geol. soc. London. 1966. Vol. 122. Pt. 3. N 487. P. 293–314; Ibid. - Journ. Geol. soc. India. 1966. Vol. 7. P. 1–14.
 Belousov V.V. Against continental drift. - Science Journ. 1967. Vol. 3. N 1. P. 2–7.
 Belousov V.V. Some comments on possible processes in the Earth's mantle. - J. R. astr. soc. 1967. Vol. 14. N 1–4. P. 371–373.
 Belousov V.V. Structural geology. M.: Mir, 1968. 180 p.
 Belousov V.V. Some problems of development of the Earth‘s crust and upper mantle of oceans // The Crust and Upper Mantle of the Pacific Area. Washington:, AGU, 1968. P. 449–459. (Geophysical Monograph Series; Vol 12)
 Belousov V.V. Interrelations between the Earth's crust and upper mantle. - The Earth's crust and upper mantle. Am. Geoph. Union, 1969. P. 698–712.
 Belousov V.V. Against the hypothesis of ocean-floor spreading. - Tectonophysics. 1970. Vol. 9. N 6. P. 489–511.
 Belousov V.V. On possible forms of relationship between magmatism and tectonogenesis // Journ. Geol. Soc. 1971. Vol. 127. N 1. P. 57–68.
 Belousov V.V. Conference reports: IUGS Symposium “Geodynamics Problems-Outlook to the 80's” [Zurich. Feb. 5–6. 1979]. Episodes. Vol. 2. N 1. 1979. P. 30.
 Belousov V.V. Geotectonics. Moscow; Berlin; New York: Mir; Springer; Heidelberg, 1980. 330 p.

References

 Geological Society of London: Foreign members // Nature. 1959. Vol. 184. N 4696. P.1360-1361.
 Belousov Vladimir Vladimirovich // The New Encyclopædia Britannica. Chicago; London [etc.]: Enc. Britannica Inc, 1986. Vol. 1. P. 83; 1992. Vol. 1. P. 84.
 Ioganson L. The 1977 Belousov letter to Khain // NCGY Journal. 2014. Vol. 2. N 3. P. 3–6.

1907 births
1990 deaths
Corresponding Members of the USSR Academy of Sciences
Foreign Fellows of the Indian National Science Academy
Recipients of the Order of Lenin
Recipients of the Order of the Red Banner of Labour
Russian geologists
Beloussov
Soviet geologists
Soviet geophysicists
Burials in Troyekurovskoye Cemetery
Presidents of the International Union of Geodesy and Geophysics
Members of the Royal Swedish Academy of Sciences